Marc Vidal may refer to:

 Marc Vidal (footballer, born 1991), French football goalkeeper
 Marc Vidal (footballer, born 2000), Spanish football goalkeeper
 Marc Vidal (chef) (born 1977), Spanish chef in the U.S.